Paul-Jacques-Aimé Baudry (7 November 1828  17 January 1886) was a French painter.

Life
Baudry was born in 1828 in La Roche-sur-Yon in the Vendée. He studied art under Michel Martin Drolling and enrolled in the École des Beaux-Arts in 1845. He won the Prix de Rome in 1850 for his picture of Zenobia found on the banks of the Araxes.
 
His talent from the first revealed itself as strictly academical, full of elegance and grace, but somewhat lacking originality. In the course of his residence in Italy Baudry derived strong inspiration from Italian art with the mannerism of Correggio, as was very evident in the two works he exhibited in the Salon of 1857, which were purchased for the Luxembourg: The Martyrdom of a Vestal Virgin and The Child.

His Leda, St John the Baptist, and a Portrait of Beul, exhibited at the same time, took a first prize that year. Throughout this early period Baudry commonly selected mythological or fanciful subjects, one of the most noteworthy being The Pearl and the Wave (1862).

Once only did he attempt an historical picture, Charlotte Corday after the assassination of Marat (1861); and returned by preference to the former class of subjects or to painting portraits of illustrious men of his day: Guizot, Charles Garnier, Edmond About.

The works that crowned Baudry's reputation were his mural decorations, which show much imagination and a high artistic gift for color, as may be seen in the frescoes in the Paris Court of Cassation, at the château de Chantilly, and some private residences the Hôtel Fould and Hôtel Paiva but, above all, in the decorations of the foyer of the Opera Garnier.

These, more than thirty paintings in all, and among them compositions figurative of dancing and music, occupied the painter for ten years. Baudry was a member of the Académie des beaux-arts, succeeding Jean-Victor Schnetz.

Baudry died in Paris in 1886. He is buried in Pere Lachaise Cemetery in Paris with a huge and highly sculptural monument.

Honours 
 1878 : Member of the Royal Academy of Science, Letters and Fine Arts of Belgium

Legacy
Two of his colleagues, Paul Dubois and Marius Jean Mercié, co-operating with his brother, Baudry the architect, erected his funeral monument in the Père Lachaise Cemetery in Paris (1890).

The statue of Baudry at La Roche-sur-Yon (1897) is by Jean-Léon Gérôme.

Gallery

See also
List of works by Paul Dubois (sculptor)
List of works by Antonin Mercié

References and sources
References

Sources

H. Delaborde, Notice sur la vie et les ouvrages de Baudry (1886); Ch. Ephrussi, Baudry, sa vie et son oevre (1887). (H. FR.)
Grunchec, P. (1985). The Grand Prix de Rome: Paintings from the École des Beaux-Arts, 1797-1863. Washington, DC: International Exhibitions Foundation. .

1828 births
1886 deaths
People from La Roche-sur-Yon
Burials at Père Lachaise Cemetery
19th-century French painters
French male painters
Prix de Rome for painting
Academic art
Members of the Académie des beaux-arts
Members of the Royal Academy of Belgium
19th-century French male artists